Felicity Field (born 4 March 1946) is a British former alpine skier who competed in the 1968 Winter Olympics, where she finished 6th, in the Downhill event.

References

External links
 

1946 births
Living people
British female alpine skiers
Olympic alpine skiers of Great Britain
Alpine skiers at the 1968 Winter Olympics